Liam Dixon (born 26 April 1993) is an English former first-class cricketer.

Dixon was born at Durham and educated in the city at the Stanley College of Technology. From there he attended the College of St Hild and St Bede at Durham University. While studying at Durham University, Dixon played first-class cricket for Durham MCCU, making two appearances in 2014 against Derbyshire at Derby, and Durham at Chester-le-Street. A right-arm medium pace bowler, Dixon took 5 wickets at an average of 36.60, with best figures of 3 for 92. He debuted in minor counties cricket for Northumberland in the 2016 MCCA Knockout Trophy, with Dixon making four appearances in the competition in 2016 and one in 2017.

References

External links

1993 births
Living people
Sportspeople from Durham, England
Cricketers from County Durham
Alumni of the College of St Hild and St Bede, Durham
English cricketers
Northumberland cricketers
Durham MCCU cricketers